The Park Central Building (also known as the Detwiler Building) is a high-rise office building located at 412 West Sixth Street in Los Angeles, California. It has 14 stories and stands at a height of 203 feet, making it the tallest building in the city from the time of its completion in 1916 until 1927, when it was surpassed by the Texaco Building.

References

External links
 official Park Central Building website
 Park Central Building at You-Are-Here.com

Buildings and structures in Downtown Los Angeles
Skyscraper office buildings in Los Angeles
Office buildings completed in 1916
1916 establishments in California
1910s architecture in the United States